The 1711 Sales Auction Catalogue of the Library of Sir Thomas Browne highlights the erudition of the physician, philosopher and encyclopedist, Sir Thomas Browne (1605-1682). It also illustrates the proliferation, distribution and availability of books printed throughout 17th century Europe which were purchased by the intelligentsia, aristocracy, priestly, physician or educated merchant-class.

Biography
Browne graduated from the University of Leiden in 1633 having previously studied at the Universities of Montpellier and Padua for his medical degree. Upon his establishment in Norwich as a physician he was able to begin a lifetime's bibliophilia, building a private library, acquiring and reading an estimated 1,500 titles. He was adept in five contemporary languages: French, Italian, Spanish, Dutch and Danish; these languages as well as Greek and Hebrew and the predominant written form of the Renaissance, namely Latin, are all represented in his Library.

The catalogue
The 1711 Sales Auction Catalogue reflects the wide scope of Browne's interests. It includes many of the sources of his encyclopaedia Pseudodoxia Epidemica which went through six editions (1646 to 1672); and established him as one of the leading intellects of 17th-century Europe.

Browne's erudite learning is reflected by the Classics of antiquity as well as history, geography, philology, philosophy, anatomy, theology, cartography, embryology, medicine, cosmography, ornithology, mineralogy, zoology, travel, law, mathematics, geometry, literature, both Continental and English, the latest advances in scientific thinking in astronomy, chemistry as well as esoteric topics such as astrology, alchemy, physiognomy and the Kabbalah are all represented in the Catalogue of his library contents. It was however not until 1986 that the Catalogue was first made widely available. The American scholar Jeremiah Stanton Finch, Dean Emeritus at Princeton University took on the task of indexing Browne's work during his retirement, completing the indexing of the books of Sir Thomas and his son Edward Browne's libraries, "after many years in many libraries". Finch noted that the Catalogue advertised books of sculpture and painting, which somehow were never delivered to the auction house. In the event, the auction held upon 8–10 January 1711 was attended by Jonathan Swift and buyers working on behalf of Sir Hans Sloane. Thus an unknown percentage of books auctioned from the Library of Sir Thomas Browne subsequently formed the foundation for the future British Library.

The 1711 Sales Auction Catalogue records the omnivorous reading and bibliophilia which Browne engaged upon for roughly sixty years, it also exemplifies the observation:

to the student of the history of ideas in its modern sense of the inter-relationship between science, art and philosophy, Browne is of great importance.

Greek literature
Aeschylus, Sophocles, Euripides ed. Johannes Meursius Leiden 1612
Archimedes, Opera 1615
Aristotle, Opera, 1615
 Rhetorica, 1619
 De Mundo, 1591
 Problemata, 1632 edited by Ludovico Settala
Aristophanes, Comedies XI, Leiden 1624
Arrian, Ponti Euxini, Geneva 1577
 de Venatione, Paris 1644
Apollonius of Rhodes, Argonautica 2 vols. Leiden 1641
Athenaeus, Deipnosophistae or Banquet of the learned ed. Isaac Casaubon 1612
Epicurus Philosophy of, ed. Pierre Gassendi 2 vols. Leiden 1649
Euclid, Elementorum Libri 6. priores, London 1620
Euripides, Tragedies, 1562
Homer, Opera, Basle 1612
Herodotus, Historia Frankfurt 1608
Iamblichus, Life of Pythagoras
The Mysteries of Egyptians and Chaldeans, Leyden 1670
Lucian, Opera, 1546
 Dialogi Selectiores, Paris 1572
Philo, Opera, Cologne 1613
Plato, Chalcidii Timaeus, Leiden 1617 (ed. Johannes Meursius)
Sibyllina Oracula, 1607
Theophrastus, Characters, notes by Isaac Casaubon, Leyden 1638
Xenophon, Cyropaedia Gk & Lat London 1674

Roman literature
Boethius, Consolation of Philosophy, 1653
Censorinus, De die natali  Leiden 1593
Cicero, Dream of Scipio 
 Opera 2 vols. 1527
  Epistulae ad Familiares 1550
Florus, Historia, Leiden 1655
Hyginus, Fabulae Paris 1578
Isidore of Seville, Originum 20 Books
 Martianus Capella, de nuptiis Philologiae et Mercurii, 1577
Juvenal, Satyrae, Leyden 1523
Macrobius, Somnium Scipionis (Dream of Scipio) 1556
Marcus Aurelius, notes by Meric Casaubon, London 1643
Ovid, Opera, London 1656
Petronius, Satyricon, 1654
Plautus, Comedies, with notes by Denis Lambin 1581
Pliny the Elder, Naturalis Historia, Brussels 1496
Propertius, cum Notis Varior. Traj. 1658
Quintilian, Institutio Oratoria 1575
Seneca, Tragedies, Leiden 1651
Suetonius, Lives of the 12 Caesars, trans. Philemon Holland 1659
Terence, Comedies, 1625
Valerius Maximus, with notes, Leiden 1651
Virgil, Opera, Amsterdam 1654
 Vitruvius, L'Architetturra di Vitruvio, tradotta & commentata da Daniele Barbaro Venice 1641

Arabic
Alhazen, Opticae Thesaurus Libri X, Basle 1572
'Ali ibn al-'Abbas al-Majusi, Liber Totius Medicine Venice 1523

Contemporary science
François d'Aguilon, Opticorum Libri 6, Antwerp 1613
Petrus Apianus, Cosmographia, Antwerp 1545
Mario Bettini, Beehives of Universal Philosophical Mathematics 1656
Isaac Barrow, Euclid's Elements, London 1660
Antonio Bosio, Roma Subterranea cum. fig. 3 Tomi in 1 vol. Cologne 1659
Robert Boyle, Usefulness of Experimental Philosophy, London 1671
Henry Briggs, Arithemica Logarithmica, London 1644
Alessandro Piccolomini, De Sphaera, Basle 1565
Thomas Digges, Alae seu Scalae Mathematicae, London 1573
Thomas Fincke, Geometria Rotundi, Basle 1583
Galileo, Dialogue Concerning the Two Chief World Systems, Trent 1635
 Sidereus Nuncius, London 1653
 Two World Systems Englished by T. Sainsbury, 1661
William Gilbert, De Magnete, Magneticisque Corporibus, et de Magno Magnete Tellure  1600
 Sir Matthew Hale's Observat. touch. the Torricelli Experiment 1674
Jean-Baptiste du Hamel, de meteoris & fossilbus, Paris 1660
 de consensu Vet. & Novae Philosophiae Paris 1663
   Paris 1670
Robert Hooke, Lectures, London 1678
Christiaan Huygens, Systema Saturnium, The Hague 1659
Johannes Kepler, Mysterium Cosmographicum, Tübingen 1596 
 de Stella nova in pede Serpentis, Prague 1606
 ad Vitellionem Paralipomena, Frankfurt 1604
 Fortunio Liceti, De lucernis antiquorum reconditis, Udine 1652
  Antiqua Schemata Gemmar. Anular. cum fig., 1653
 De spontaneo viventium ortu libri quatuor, Vicenza 1618
 De his, qui diu vivunt sine alimento, Padua 1612
 De quaesitis per epistolas a claris viris responsa, Bologna 1640
 De Terra & de Lucidis in Sublimi, Udine 1640
 De lapide Bononiensi & Qualitis, Udine 1640
 De regulari motu minimaque parallaxi cometarum coelestium disputationes, Udine 1640
 Jan Marek Marci, Idearum Operatricum Idea Hannover 1635
William Oughtred, Clavis Mathematica London 1648
Georg Purbach, Theoricae novae Planetarum, Basle 1568
Regiomontanus, Tabulae Directionum & Prosectionum, 1551
Robert Recorde, Whetstone of Witte, 1557
Christoph Scheiner, Rosa Ursina sive Sol Bracciano, 1630
Gaspar Schott, Magia Universalis Natura Artis 4 vols.Würtzburg 1657
John Speed, History of Great Britain, 2nd ed. 1627
Niccolò Fontana Tartaglia, Euclide rassettato & alla Integrità ridotto 1543
Godefroy Wendelin Of the cause of purple rain in Brussels, Brussels 1647

Philosophy
 Francis Bacon, Advancement of Learning, 1628 
 Natural History, 1628 
 Opuscula Philosophica, 1658
Bellarmine, Apologia pro Jure Princip., 1611
Charles de Bovelles, Liber de intellectu. Liber de sensibus. Liber de generatione. Libellus de nihilo. Ars oppositorum. Liber de sapiente. Liber de duodecim numeris. Philosophicae epistulae. Liber de perfectis numeris. Libellus de mathematicis rosis. Liber de mathematicis corporibus. Libellus de mathematicis supplementis Paris 1510 
 René Descartes, Discourse on Method, 1637, 1st edition
 Méditations, 1644
 Meditationes de prima Philosophia, Amsterdam 1644
 Principia Philosophia, Amsterdam 1656
 Lettres, Paris 1657
 de la Lumière &c., Paris 1664
 les Passions de l'âme, Amsterdam 1650
 Compendium of Musick, London 1653
 Of a Method for the well-guiding of Reason, London 1649
Thomas Hobbes, Elementorum Philosophiae Sectio Secunda de Homine, 1658
 Elementa Philosophica de Cive 2nd edit., Amsterdam 1647
Justus Lipsius, Opera, 4 Tomi in 3 vol., Antwerp 1637
Jan Gruter, Inscriptiones antiquae totius orbis Romani, 2 vols. Heidelberg 1603
Machiavelli, History of Florence, Strasbourg 1610
Blaise Pascal, Pensées 1670
 Discours sur les mêmes Pensées, 1672
 Francis Osborne, Collected Works 1675

Theology
Augustine of Hippo, City of God, 1620
Thomas Aquinas, Summa Theologiae, Paris 1638
Richard Baxter, Reasons of the Christian Religion 1667
Samuel Bochart, Geographica sacra seu Phaleg et Canaan, cum. Tabul Geograph. Caen 1642
Jean Bodin, Demonomania, Basle 1581
Johannes Buxtorf, Lexicon Chaldaic.Talmudic & Rabbinic Basle 1639
 Epitome Grammaticae, Hebraea London 1653
 Lexicon Hebraic.& Chaldaic  London 1646
 Epitome Grammaticae Hebraea Basle 1629
Clement of Alexandria, Opera, Paris 1629
Ralph Cudworth, On the true Notion of the Lord's Supper, London 1642
Pseudo-Dionysius the Areopagite, Opera, Basle 1571
Erasmus, Preparations for death, Basle 1532
Joseph Hall, Works, vol. 1st and 3rd London 1647,1662
Justin Martyr, Opera Paris 1636
Jerome, Opera 9  Tomi, in 4 vol Paris 1643
Martin Luther, Commentary on the Epistle to the Galatians, 2nd edit. 1577
Marin Mersenne, Questions in Genesis, Paris 1623
Benito Arias Montano, New Testament, Greek & Latin Geneva 1619
Sebastian Münster, Opus Grammat. (Hebrew), Basle 1542
 Grammatica Chaldaica, Basle 1527
 Rabbi Abrahami Sphaera Mundi (Hebrew), Latinized 1546
Alexander Nowell, Catechism 1575
Origen, Opera, Basle 1571
James Usher, London 1652
George Wither, Discourse of the Nature of Man, and his State after Death 1650

Medical
Avicenna, Opera, 2 vols. 1608 Venice
Thomas Bartholin, Anatomia Reformata, Leyden 1651 
de Medicina Danorun Domestica, Hannover 1666
 de Luce Animalium, Leyden 1647
 Historiar. Anatomic. rarior. Cent. VI, 3 vol. Hannover 1654
 de Pulmonum Substantia et Motu, Hannover 1663
 de Lacteis Thoracicis, London 1652
 de Ovariis Mulierum & Generat. Historia, 1678
Gerolamo Cardano Opera, 10 vol. Leyden 1663
Aulus Cornelius Celsus De Medicina 8 Libri Basle 1592 
Realdo Colombo De Re Anatomica Libri XV Venice 1559 
Pedanius Dioscorides Opera, 1598
 Parabilia, 1598
Charles Estienne, De dissectione Corporis humani, 1545
Hieronymus Fabricius Opera Anatomica, Paris 1625
 De Visione, Voce & Auditu, Venice 1600
 Ab Aquapendente Opera Chirurgica, Venice 1619
Fallopius, Opera, Frankfurt 1600
Jean Fernel, Cosmotheoria, 1528
Leonhart Fuchs, de humani Corporis fabrica Leiden 1551
 Paradoxor. Medicinae Libri 3 Venice 1547
Galen, Opera, 5 books in 3 vols. Basle 1538
Pierre Gassendi, Vita Epicuri, Leiden 1647
 de apparente magnitudine solis humilis et sublimis, Paris 1642
 Instit. Astronomia item Galileo et Kepler, 1683
 Exercitatio Anatomica de Motu Cordis et Sanguinis in Animalibus, 1648
Francis Glisson, De ventriculo & Intestinis, London 1677
  de Rachitide, London 1650
Jonathan Goddard, Unhappy condition of Practice of Physick in London, 1670
Johannes Goropius Becanus, Origines Antwerpianae  1569
William Harvey, De Generatione, London 1651
Exercitatio Anatomica de Motu Cordis et Sanguinis in Animalibus
Hippocrates, Opera 1624
Aphorismi & Prognost in Greek and Latin, ed. Jo. Butino 1625
Coacae Praenotiones, notes by John Johnson, Amsterdam 1660
de Morbis Mulierum, Paris 1585
Praenotiones, Paris 1585
Marcello Malpighi, De viscerum structura, London 1669
de formatione Pulli in Ovo, London 1673
de Viscerum Structura, London 1669
Adrian von Mynsicht Thesaurus et Armamentarium Medico-Chymicum 1631
Jan Swammerdam, Uteri Muliebris Fabrica, London 1680
 of Respiration, Leiden 1667
Thomas Sydenham, Observationes Medical., London 1676
 de Podagra & Hydrope, London 1683
 Schedula Monitoria de nova Febris Ingressu, London 1686
 Epist. duae de Morbis Epidem. & de Lue Venera, London 1680
 Dissertatio Epistolaris, London 1682
Walter Charleton, Enquiries into Human Nature, 1680
 Darkness of Atheism dispelled by Nature's Light, 1652
George Ent, Apolog. pro Circulatione Sanguinis adv. et Parisanum, London 1641
Franz de la Boe a.k.a. Franciscus Sylvius
Thomas Willis, Opera varia, 5 vols. London 1664
 Cerebri Anatome cum fig., London 1664
Richard Lower, De Corde: item de motu & colore sanguinis, London 1670
Julius Caesar Scaliger, On Insomnia, Geneva 1610
Vesalius, De humani corporis fabrica  8 Books 1555
Jacques Dubois aka Jacobus Sylvius,  Paris 1630

Esoteric
Elias Ashmole ed., Theatrum Chemicum Britannicum, 1652 
J.J. Becher  Physica subterranea  Frankfurt 1669
Guido Bonatti de Astronomica Tract Basel 1550
Tommaso Campanella, 7 Astrological books, Frankfurt 1630
Jerome Cardan Opera omnia 10 vols. Leiden 1663
Arthur Dee, Fasciculus Chemicus
Marsilio Ficino, Theologia Platonica de Immortalitate Animorum, Paris 1559
Jacques Gaffarel, Unheard-of Curiosities, Paris 1650
Francesco Giorgi,  De harmonia mundi, Venice 1525
Johann Glauber, de natura Salium, Amsterdam 1658
Lucas Gauricus, super Dieb. Decretoriis sive Criticis Axiomata Rome 1546
Helvetius, Miraculo transmutandi Metallica, Antwerp 1667 
 Athanasius Kircher, Ars Magna Lucis et Umbrae, Rome 1646
 Obeliscus Pamphilius, Rome 1650
 Oedipus Aegyptiacus, Rome 1652
 Magnes sive de Arte Magnetica, Rome 1654
 Mundus Subterraneus, 2 Vols. Amsterdam 1665
 Heinrich Khunrath Medulla Distillatoria & Medica. Hamburg 1638
Raymund Lull, Vademecum, quo sontes Alchemica Art, 1572 
 Pierio Valeriano Bolzani Hieroglyphica sive de sacris Aegyptiorum litteris 1631
Pico della Mirandola Cabalistarum Selectiora Obscurioraque Dogmata, Venice 1569
 Jean-Baptiste Morin Astrologica Gallica  1661
Paracelsus, Opera Medico-Chimica, Frankfurt 1603
Petrae, Nosologia Harmonica Dogmatica et Hermetica, 1615
Giambattista della Porta, Natural Magic, 1644
 Villa, 12 Books Frankfurt 1592
Phytognomica, Naples 1588
Coelestis Physiogranonia, Naples 1603
de Miracoli & Maravigliosi Effetti dalla Natura prodotti, Venice 1665
William Ramsay, Judicial Astrology vindicated 1651
Henry Ranzovus, Astrologia Scientiae Certitudo, 1585
Martin Ruland, Dictionary of alchemy, 1612
Sendivogius, The true secret Philosophy, Castile 1651
Oswald Schreckenfuchs Commentaries on George Peurbach Basle 1569
Theatrum Chemicum, 5 vols inc. vol. 1 Gerhard Dorn Strasbourg 1613
Johannes Trithemius, Polygraphiae Libri 6., Cologne 1571
Basil Valentine, Currus Triumphalis, with fig., Amsterdam 1671
Thomas Vaughan, A Hermeticall Banquet drest by a Spagyrical Cook, 1652
Blaise de Vigenère, Tract du Feu & du Sel, Rouen 1642
Vossius, De Idolatria (1642)
Johann Weyer, Opera, Amsterdam 1660

Natural history
Georg Agricola, de Re Metallica, Basle 1621
 de Ortu & Causis Subterraneor, Basle 1558
Ulisse Aldrovandi, Museum Metallicum cum fig., Bologna 1648
 Serpentium and Draconum historia cum fig., Bologna 1640
 Ornithtologia sive de Avibus Historia, cum fig., Frankfurt 1610 
Quadrupedum Bisulcorum Historia, cum fig., Bologna 1642
de Quadrupedib. Digitatis Viviparis & Oviparis, 1637
de Quadupedib. Animalibus & Piscibus, Frankfurt 1610
 Monstror. Historia, cum fig., Bologna 1642
Prospero Alpini, de Medicina Medicae, Patav. 1611
 de Plantis Egypti, Patav. 1640
 de Medicina Egypti, 1646
 de praesagienda Vita & Morte Aegrotantium, Venice 1601
 J. Bauhin, Historica Plant., 3 Vols. 1650
Hist. Fontis & Balnei Bollenis, Montpellier 1598
 C. Bauhin, Prodomus Theatri Botanici, Frankfurt 1620
 Pinax Theatri Botanici, Basle 1623
 de Hermaphroditor. Natura, 1614
J.J. Becher, Physica Subterranea, Frankfurt 1669
Pierre Belon, Histoire de la Nature des Oiseaux avec leurs Descriptions & naises traits retirez du Naturel, Paris 1555
Carolus Clusius Exoticorum libri decem Leiden 1605 
  Leiden 1611
Conrad Gessner, Opera, 4 vols. Zurich 1551
 de Avibus, cum fig. illuminatus
 Epistolae Medicinales Zurich 1577
 Thomas Muffet, De Insect cum fig, London 1634
 Nosomantica Hippocratea, Frankfurt 1588
John Ray, Catalogus Plantar. Angliae, London 1670
 Historia Plantarum, London 1670
Guillaume Rondelet De Piscibus Marinis 1554
Nicolas Steno, Concerning Solids naturally contained within solids, 1671
 Elementor Myologiae Specimen, cum fig., Amsterdam 1669
 Observationes Anatomicae cum fig., Leiden 1662
 de Cerebri Anatome, Leiden 1671
Francis Willughby, Ornithologia, cum fig. London 1676
Olaus Wormius, Museum Wormianum, Leyden 1655

Literature
Dante, La Terza Rima 
George Herbert, The Temple, sacred poems, Cambridge 1641
Milton, Paradise Lost, 1674
Paradise Regained, with Samson Agonistes, 1671
Abraham Cowley, Poems, with his Davideis 1656
Edmund Spenser, Works, 1679
 The Faerie Queene in 12 books, 1609
Ben Jonson, Works, 2 Vols. 1616/1640
Edmund Gayton's Pleasant notes upon Don Quixote 1654

Geography and history
Thomas Fuller, A Pisgah-Sight of Palestine with maps, 1650
John Greaves, A description of the Grand Signiors Seraglio 1650
 Pyramidographia, or a Description of the Pyramids in Egypt 1646 
Saxo Grammaticus, Gesta Danorum Paris, 1514
James Howell, Of the Precedency of Kings, 1664
Athanasius Kircher, China Illustrata, Amsterdam 1667
Gerardus Mercator, Atlas sive Cosmographicae Meditationes de Fabrica Mundi et Fabricati Figura, Amsterdam 1613
 Claude Mydorge, Examen du Livre des recreations Mathematiques, Paris 1639
Abraham Ortelius, Theatrum Orbis Terrarum Antwerp 1574
 Thesaurus Geographic. recognit. & auctus 1611
 Itinerar. per Galliae Belgicae partes Plant. 1584
Strabo, Geographia 17 Books Commentary Isaac Casaubon Paris 1620
 Of the Kingdom of Naples, 1654
 Of the Signorie of Venice, 1651
 Of Hungary and Transylvania, 1664
 Instructions for Foreign Travels, 1642

Miscellaneous
 Sebastián de Covarrubias, Emblems Morales Madrid 1610
Thomas Morley, A Plaine and Easie Introduction to Practicall Musicke London 1597
Valentin Schindler, Lexicon Pentaglotton Hebraic., Chaldic., Syrian., Arabic., 1612
 Artificia Hominum, Miranda Naturae, in Sina & Europa, 1655
  Ethiopian Dictionary 1674

Sources
A Facsimile of the 1711 Sales Auction Catalogue of Sir Thomas Browne and his son Edward's Libraries. Introduction, notes and index by J.S. Finch (E.J. Brill: Leiden, 1986)

See also
 Music, mysticism and Magic – A sourcebook ed. Joscelyn Godwin pub. Arkana 1986
 The greatest benefit to Mankind. A medical history from antiquity to the present. Roy Porter Harper and Collins 1999

References

External links
 Aquarium of Vulcan:Library of Sir Thomas Browne

Defunct libraries